Evangelia "Evi" Kyriakidou (born July 27, 1981) is a volleyball player from Greece. who has been member of the Greece women's national volleyball team. She was a part of the Greek national team at the 2011 Women's European Volleyball League. At club level, she played most notably for Greek powerhouse Olympiacos Piraeus (2004–2005 and 2010–2012), winning the Greek Cup in 2011.

Sporting achievements

National cups
 2010/2011  Greek Cup, with Olympiacos Piraeus

References

External links
 profile at greekvolley.gr 
 profile at CEV web site at cev.lu
 profile at worldofvolley.com

1981 births
Living people
Olympiacos Women's Volleyball players
Greek women's volleyball players
Volleyball players from Thessaloniki
21st-century Greek women